Adrien-Louis de Bonnières, comte later duc de Guînes (14 April 1735, in Lille – 21 December 1806, in Paris) was an aristocrat of the Ancien Régime, who served as a French Army general and diplomat; he was also a favourite of Queen Marie-Antoinette.

Career

Commissioned into the Grenadiers à Cheval de la Garde Impériale, he saw active service during the Seven Years' War commanding the Royal Navarre Cavalry Regiment. Appointed in 1762 Brigadier-General de Bonnières was promoted Maréchal de camp in 1770.

After his father's death in 1763, he was accorded the courtesy title of comte de Guînes and embarked upon a diplomatic career, both buoyed and hampered by a dry wit. "It was a most lively animated gazette," the comtesse de Genlis who was smitten and let it be known after a visit to the Prince of Conti in 1766, where de Guînes was present: "his whole reputation hangs on a manner of spying out all the little ridiculous trifles and of an ill-grace, which he relates in few words with an amusing manner". A protégé of Choiseul and Noailles, and a friend of Frederick II of Prussia whom he had met in 1766, the Count was despatched as ambassador to Berlin in 1768, but soon fell out of favour with some Prussian courtiers to such an extent that he was recalled in November 1769.

As a consolation, upon Queen Marie-Antoinette's instigation, he was appointed Ambassador to the Court of St James's the following year, and remained in that post, with periodic visits to Versailles, until 1776.  His reputation in London was very good, in stark contrast to his predecessors Châtelet, Guerchy and Durand de Linois. Although his affair with Lady Elizabeth Craven became well known this was mostly overlooked in view of her acclaimed beauty and charm. It was said of him that when the noon gun was fired, and someone in his entourage asked what that was, the Count quipped "I think they've sighted the sun"! He gained a wider notoriety with the awkward "Guînes affair" requiring him to press charges, 20 April 1771, against his private secretary, Barthélemy Tort de La Sonde, whom he asserted used his name in speculating with and thereby misappropriating French government funds. Tort, on being arrested, claimed that he had acted upon de Guînes' directions and for his account. In Paris, on 6 June 1771 Armand, duc d'Aiguillon (Secretary of State for Foreign Affairs), took Tort's side ill-advisedly, whereas the Queen defended her friend de Guînes, and the affair was taken up by the antagonistic parties of Choiseul and Aiguillon. De Guînes was eventually proven not guilty, by a narrow margin, in a specially convened Council of State commanded by King Louis XVI. The trial's aftermath rankled; it was among the reasons for the dismissal of Aiguillon, having incurred the Queen's and others' lasting displeasure.

On his return to France he was created Duc de Guînes and remained in royal favour, being appointed Chevalier of the Order of the Holy Spirit on 1 January 1784. A Knight of Malta through his family, he also received the Mérite militaire and Grand Cross of Saint-Louis.

He was appointed to the Council of War in 1787, and Governor of Artois in 1788. On the eve of the French Revolution, De Guînes was nominated to the Second Assembly of Notables which sat from 6 November to 12 December 1788. Having returned to England at the outbreak of the French Revolution, he returned under the Consulate  and died at Hôtel de Castries, Paris in 1806.

The Duke of Guînes and his friend King Frederick of Prussia were both accomplished flautists and they commissioned from Mozart the familiar Concerto for Flute and Harp (K. 299), written in 1778. Mozart was engaged as tutor to the duke's daughter, Marie-Adrienne, but was somewhat frustrated to discover she didn't seem to share her father's musical ability; when Amadeus requested payment, the duke's head butler is reported to have settled at half the agreed amount: "There's noble treatment for you,.." Mozart wrote to his father.

De Guînes eventually became so corpulent he had two sets of breeches, one for sitting and a tighter set when he would only be standing. His valet apparently asked each morning, "Will Monsieur be sitting today..?"; if not, the duke would be lowered into a pair of breeches with the aid of two footmen.

Family
Descended from the ancient Artois family of the comtes de Guisnes, he was the son of Guy-Louis de Bonnières, comte de Souâtre (died 1763), by his wife Adrienne-Louise-Isabelle (died 1794), daughter of Adrien-Frédéric de Melun, marquis de Cottènes.

In 1753, he married Caroline-Françoise-Philippine, daughter of Louis-François-Joseph, Prince de Montmorency-Longny; their only daughter Marie-Adrienne married in 1778 Charles de La Croix de Castries who was created Duc de Castries in 1784, with special remainder to the Guînes dukedom (although this expired when his wife predeceased her father). One of De Guînes' brothers-in-law was Charles-François de Broglie, marquis de Ruffec.

The Dowager Duchess died in 1810.

See also
 Château de Guînes
 List of Ambassadors of France to Germany
 List of Ambassadors of France to Great Britain

Notes

External links
 www.heraldique-europeenne.org
 www.musee-guines.fr

1735 births
1806 deaths
People from Lille
Counts of Guînes
Dukes of Guînes
18th-century French diplomats
French classical flautists
18th-century French musicians
French Army officers
French military personnel of the Seven Years' War
Ambassadors of France to Great Britain
Ambassadors of France to Prussia
French noble families
Knights of Malta
Knights of the Order of Saint Louis